Sarah Woodward (born 3 April 1963) is a British actress. She won the Olivier Award for best performance in a supporting role in 1998 for her role in Tom & Clem by Stephen Churchett., directed by Richard Wilson, and was nominated for a Tony Award in 2000 for her role in the Donmar Warehouse production of Tom Stoppard's The Real Thing. opposite Jennifer Ehle and Stephen Dillane, directed by David Levaux. She is the daughter of actor Edward Woodward and his first wife, actress Venetia Barrett, sister of actor Tim Woodward, actor, voice artist, and screenwriter Peter Woodward, and half-sister to actress Emily Woodward, whose mother is actress Michele Dotrice. She is married to actor Patrick Toomey. They have two daughters and live in London.

Career
Woodward trained as an actress at RADA, where she won the Bancroft Gold Medal, before joining the Royal Shakespeare Company, where she appeared in Shakespeare's Richard III with Antony Sher, and Henry V with Kenneth Branagh. She returned to the RSC in 1993, playing Miranda in The Tempest, directed by Sam Mendes, with whom she has also worked on London Assurance, with Paul Eddington; Kean, with Derek Jacobi; and Habeas Corpus with Imelda Staunton, Brenda Blethyn, and Jim Broadbent.  She won the Olivier Award for best performance in a supporting role in 1998 for her role in Tom & Clem by Stephen Churchett., and was nominated for a Tony Award in 2000 for her role in the Donmar Warehouse production of Tom Stoppard's The Real Thing.

Credits

Film

Television

Theatre

References

External links

Spotlight Directory Page

1963 births
Living people
English film actresses
English television actresses
Actresses from London
Alumni of RADA
Royal Shakespeare Company members
20th-century English actresses
21st-century English actresses
English stage actresses